Château Cissac is a winery in the Haut-Médoc appellation of the Bordeaux wine region of France. Cissac produces long-lived red wines and is classified as a Cru Bourgeois. The Château is owned by the Vialard family.

See also 
 Bordeaux wine

External links 
 Château Cissac website

Bordeaux wine producers